Cooper Kinderdine Watson (June 18, 1810 – May 20, 1880, age 69) was a U.S. Representative from Ohio.

Born in Jefferson County, Kentucky, Watson pursued preparatory studies.
He studied law.
He was admitted to the bar and commenced practice in Delaware, Ohio.
He moved to Marion, Ohio.
He was an unsuccessful candidate for prosecuting attorney of Marion County in 1839.
He moved to Tiffin, Ohio, and practiced law for twenty years or more.

Watson was elected as a Republican and Oppositionist to the Thirty-fourth Congress (March 4, 1855 – March 3, 1857).
He was an unsuccessful candidate for reelection in 1856 to the Thirty-fifth Congress.
He resumed the practice of law.
He moved to Sandusky, Ohio.
He served as member of the State constitutional convention in 1871.
He was appointed judge of the court of common pleas in 1876 and served until his death in Sandusky, Ohio, May 20, 1880.
He was interred in Greenlawn Cemetery, Tiffin, Ohio.

In 1830 Watson married Caroline S. Durkee, who survived him with four children.

References

External links

 

1810 births
1880 deaths
Politicians from Louisville, Kentucky
Opposition Party members of the United States House of Representatives from Ohio
Ohio Republicans
American judges
People from Tiffin, Ohio
People from Marion, Ohio
Politicians from Sandusky, Ohio
19th-century American politicians
19th-century American judges
19th-century American lawyers